Cabaret is a 1966 musical with music by John Kander, lyrics by Fred Ebb, and book by Joe Masteroff. The musical was based on John Van Druten's 1951 play I Am a Camera which was adapted from Goodbye to Berlin (1939), a semi-autobiographical novel by Anglo-American writer Christopher Isherwood which drew upon his experiences in the poverty-stricken Weimar Republic and his intimate friendship with nineteen-year-old cabaret singer Jean Ross.

Set in 1929–1930 Berlin during the twilight of the Jazz Age as the Nazis are ascending to power, the musical focuses on the hedonistic nightlife at the seedy Kit Kat Klub and revolves around American writer Clifford Bradshaw's relations with English cabaret performer Sally Bowles. A subplot involves the doomed romance between German boarding house owner Fräulein Schneider and her elderly suitor Herr Schultz, a Jewish fruit vendor.

Overseeing the action is the Master of Ceremonies at the Kit Kat Klub, and the club itself serves as a metaphor for ominous political developments in late Weimar Germany. The musical depicts Weimar-era Berlin during this chaotic interwar period as a carnival of debauchery and despair inhabited by desperate people who are unaware of the national catastrophe that awaits them.

The original Broadway production opened on November 20, 1966, at the Broadhurst Theatre in New York City and became a box office hit that ran for 1,166 performances. The award-winning musical inspired numerous subsequent productions in London and New York as well as the 1972 film of the same name.

Background

Historical basis 

The events depicted in the 1966 musical are derived from Anglo-American writer Christopher Isherwood's semi-autobiographical tales of his colorful escapades in the Weimar Republic. In 1929, Isherwood visited Weimar-era Berlin during the final months of the Golden Twenties. At the time, Isherwood was an apprentice novelist who was politically indifferent about the rise of fascism in Germany. He relocated to Berlin in order to avail himself of underage male prostitutes and to enjoy the city's orgiastic Jazz Age cabarets. He socialized with a coterie of gay writers that included Stephen Spender, Paul Bowles, and W.H. Auden.

In Berlin, Isherwood shared modest lodgings with 19-year-old British flapper Jean Ross, an aspiring film actress who earned her living as a chanteuse in lesbian bars and second-rate cabarets. While rooming together with Isherwood at Nollendorfstrasse 17 in Schöneberg, Ross engaged in a series of brief heterosexual liaisons and became pregnant. She assumed the father of the child to be jazz pianist—and later film actor—Peter van Eyck.

As a personal favor to Ross, Isherwood pretended to be her heterosexual impregnator in order to facilitate an abortion procedure. Ross nearly died as a result of the botched abortion due to the carelessness of the doctor. Following the procedure, Isherwood visited an ailing Ross in a Berlin hospital. Wrongly assuming the shy gay author to be her heterosexual partner, the hospital staff despised him for callously forcing Ross to undergo a near-fatal abortion. These tragicomic events later inspired Isherwood to write his 1937 novella Sally Bowles and serves as its narrative climax.

While Ross recovered from the botched abortion procedure, the political situation rapidly deteriorated in Weimar Germany as the incipient Nazi Party continued to grow stronger day by day. As Berlin's daily scenes featured "poverty, unemployment, political demonstrations and street fighting between the forces of the extreme left and the extreme right," Isherwood, Ross, Spender, and other British nationals soon realized that they must leave the country. "There was a sensation of doom to be felt in the Berlin streets," Spender recalled.

Two weeks after Adolf Hitler implemented the Enabling Act which cemented his dictatorship, Isherwood fled Germany and returned to England on April 5, 1933. Afterwards, most of Berlin's seedy cabarets were shuttered by the Nazis, and many of Isherwood's cabaret acquaintances would later flee abroad or perish in concentration camps. These factual events served as the genesis for Isherwood's Berlin tales. His 1939 novel Goodbye to Berlin was later adapted by playwright John Van Druten into the 1951 Broadway play I Am a Camera and, ultimately, the 1966 Cabaret musical.

Musical development 

In early 1963, producer David Black commissioned English composer and lyricist Sandy Wilson to undertake a musical adaptation of Van Druten's 1951 play I Am a Camera. Black envisioned the musical as a star vehicle for singer Julie Andrews, but Andrews' manager refused to allow her to accept the role of Sally Bowles due to the character's immorality. By the time Wilson completed his work, however, Black's option on both the 1951 Van Druten play and its source material by Isherwood had lapsed and been acquired by rival Broadway producer Harold Prince.

Prince hired playwright Joe Masteroff to work on the adaptation. Prince and Masteroff believed that Wilson's score failed to capture the carefree hedonism of the Jazz Age in late 1920s Berlin. Consequently, the songwriting team John Kander and Fred Ebb were invited to join the project. Their new version was initially a dramatic play preceded by a prologue of songs describing the Berlin atmosphere from various points of view. As the composers distributed the songs between scenes, they realized the story could be told in the structure of a more traditional book musical, and they replaced several songs with tunes more relevant to the plot.

Prince and Masteroff altered Isherwood's original characters as well. The male protagonist became an American writer; the antisemitic landlady was transformed into a tolerant woman with a Jewish beau who owned a fruit store; the two language students were excised, and new characters—such as  the Nazi smuggler Ernst Ludwig—were added for dramatic purposes. The musical ultimately expressed two stories in one: the first, a revue centered on the decadence of the Kit Kat Klub; the second, a story set in the society of the club.

In Fall 1966, the musical entered rehearsals. After viewing one of the last rehearsals before the company headed to Boston for the pre-Broadway run, Prince's friend Jerome Robbins suggested cutting the songs outside the cabaret, but Prince ignored his advice. In Boston, lead actress Jill Haworth struggled with her characterization of Sally Bowles. Critics thought Sally's blonde hair and white dress suggested a debutante at a senior prom instead of a cabaret singer, so Sally became a brunette before the show opened on Broadway.

Prince's staging was unusual for the time. As the audience filled the theater, the curtain was already up, revealing a stage containing only a large mirror reflecting the auditorium. There was no overture; instead, a drum roll and cymbal crash led into the opening number. The juxtaposition of dialogue scenes with expository songs and separate cabaret numbers providing social commentary was a novel concept that initially startled audiences. Gradually, they came to understand the difference between the two and were able to accept the reasoning behind them.

Synopsis

Act I 

At the twilight of the Jazz Age in Berlin, the incipient Nazi Party is growing stronger. The Kit Kat Klub is a seedy cabaret—a place of decadent celebration. The club's Master of Ceremonies, or Emcee, together with the cabaret girls and waiters, warm up the audience ("Willkommen"). Meanwhile, a young American writer named Clifford Bradshaw arrives via a railway train in Berlin. He has journeyed to the city to work on a new novel. Cliff encounters Ernst Ludwig, a German smuggler who offers him black market work and recommends a boarding house. At the boarding house, the proprietress Fräulein Schneider offers Cliff a room for one hundred reichsmarks, but he can only pay fifty. After a brief debate, she relents and allows Cliff to live there for fifty marks. Fräulein Schneider observes that she has learned to take whatever life offers ("So What?").

When Cliff visits the Kit Kat Klub, the Emcee introduces an English chanteuse, Sally Bowles, who performs a flirtatious number ("Don't Tell Mama"). Afterward, she asks Cliff to recite poetry for her, and he recites Ernest Thayer's tragic poem "Casey at the Bat". Cliff offers to escort Sally home, but she says that her boyfriend Max, the club's owner, is too jealous. Sally performs her final number at the Kit Kat Klub aided by a female ensemble of jazz babies ("Mein Herr"). The cabaret ensemble performs a song and dance, calling each other on inter-table phones and inviting each other for dances and drinks ("The Telephone Song").

The next day at the boarding house, Cliff has just finished giving an English lesson to Ernst when Sally arrives. Max has fired her and thrown her out, and now she has no place to live. Sally asks Cliff if she can live in his room. At first he resists, but she convinces him to take her in ("Perfectly Marvelous"). The Emcee and two female companions sing a song ("Two Ladies") that comments on Cliff and Sally's new living arrangement. Herr Schultz, an elderly Jewish fruit-shop owner who lives in the boarding house, gives a pineapple to Fräulein Schneider as a romantic gesture ("It Couldn't Please Me More"). In the Kit Kat Klub, a young waiter starts to sing a song—a patriotic anthem to the Fatherland that slowly descends into a darker, Nazi-inspired marching song—becoming the strident "Tomorrow Belongs to Me". He initially sings a cappella, before the customers and the band join in.

Months later, Cliff and Sally are still living together and have grown intimate. Cliff knows that he is in a "dream", but he enjoys living with Sally too much to come to his senses ("Why Should I Wake Up?"). Sally reveals that she is pregnant, but she does not know who is the father and decides to obtain an abortion. Cliff reminds her that it could be his child and tries to convince her to have the baby ("Maybe This Time"). Ernst enters and offers Cliff a chance to earn easy money—picking up a suitcase in Paris and delivering it to his "client" in Berlin. The Emcee comments on this with the song "Sitting Pretty" (or, in later versions, "Money").

Meanwhile, Fräulein Schneider has caught one of her boarders, the prostitute Fräulein Kost, bringing sailors into her room. Fräulein Schneider forbids her from doing so again, but Kost threatens to leave. Kost reveals that she has seen Fräulein Schneider with Herr Schultz in her room. Herr Schultz saves Fräulein Schneider's reputation by telling Fräulein Kost that he and Fräulein Schneider are to be married in three weeks. After Fräulein Kost departs, Fräulein Schneider thanks Herr Schultz for lying to Fräulein Kost. Herr Schultz says that he was serious and proposes to Fräulein Schneider ("Married").

At Fräulein Schneider and Herr Schultz's engagement party, Cliff arrives and delivers the suitcase of contraband to Ernst. Afterward, seeking revenge on Fräulein Schneider, Kost tells Ernst, who now sports a Nazi armband, that Schultz is a Jew. Ernst warns Schneider that marrying a Jew is unwise. Kost and company reprise "Tomorrow Belongs to Me", with more overtly Nazi overtones, as Cliff, Sally, Schneider, Schultz, and the Emcee look on.

Act II 

The cabaret girls—along with the Emcee in drag—perform a kickline routine which eventually becomes a goose-step. Fräulein Schneider expresses her concerns about her impending nuptials to Herr Schultz, who assures her that everything will be all right ("Married" Reprise). They are interrupted by the crash of a brick being thrown through the glass window of Herr Schultz's fruit shop. Schultz tries to reassure her that it is merely rowdy children making trouble, but Fräulein Schneider is now afraid.

Back at the Kit Kat Klub, the Emcee performs a song-and-dance routine with a woman in a gorilla suit, singing that their love has been met with universal disapproval ("If You Could See Her"). Encouraging the audience to be more open-minded, he defends his ape-woman, concluding with, "if you could see her through my eyes... she wouldn't look Jewish at all." Fräulein Schneider goes to Cliff and Sally's room and returns their engagement present, explaining that her marriage has been called off. When Cliff protests and states that she can't just give up this way, she asks him what other choice she has ("What Would You Do?").

Cliff begs Sally to leave Germany with him so that they can raise their child together in America. Sally protests and claims that their life in Berlin is wonderful. Cliff urges her to "wake up" and to notice the growing social upheaval around them. Sally retorts that politics have nothing to do with them and returns to the Kit Kat Klub ("I Don't Care Much"). At the club, after another heated argument with Sally, Cliff is accosted by Ernst, who has another delivery job for him. Cliff tries to brush him off. When Ernst inquires if Cliff's attitude towards him is because of "that Jew at the party", Cliff attacks him—only to be beaten by Ernst's bodyguards and ejected from the club. On stage, the Emcee introduces Sally, who enters to perform again, singing that "life is a cabaret, old chum," cementing her decision to live in carefree ignorance ("Cabaret").

The next morning, a bruised Cliff is packing his clothes in his room when Herr Schultz visits. He informs Cliff that he is moving to another boarding house, but he is confident that these difficult times will soon pass. He understands the German people, he declares, because he is a German too. When Sally returns, she announces that she has had an abortion, and Cliff slaps her. He still hopes that she will join him in France, but Sally retorts that she has "always hated Paris." She hopes that, when Cliff finally writes his novel, he will dedicate the work to her. Cliff leaves, heartbroken.

On the railway train to Paris, Cliff begins to compose his novel, reflecting on his experiences: "There was a cabaret, and there was a master of ceremonies ... and there was a city called Berlin, in a country called Germany—and it was the end of the world and I was dancing with Sally Bowles—and we were both fast asleep" ("Willkommen" Reprise). In the Kit Kat Klub, the Emcee welcomes the audience, and the backdrop raises to reveal a white space with the ensemble standing within. The cabaret ensemble reprises "Willkommen", but the song is now harsh and discordant as the Emcee sings, "Auf Wiedersehen... à bientôt..."  followed by a crescendo-ing drum roll and a cymbal crash.

Characters 

Sally Bowles – (Alto); a British flapper who is the headlining chanteuse at the seedy Kit Kat Klub
The Emcee(Baritenor); the Master of Ceremonies at the Kit Kat Klub, a leering, ghoulish, flamboyant figure
Clifford Bradshaw(Bass-baritone); an American writer who has come to Berlin in order to write a novel
Fräulein Schneider(Contralto); an older German woman who runs the boarding house where Cliff and Sally reside
Herr Schultz(Baritenor); an elderly Jewish fruit shop owner who falls in love with Fräulein Schneider
Ernst Ludwig(Baritone); a German smuggler who befriends Cliff when he arrives in Berlin, later revealed to be a Nazi
Fräulein Kost(Mezzo-soprano); a German prostitute who rents a room in Fräulein Schneider's boarding house
Maria, Lulu, Rosie, Fritzie, Texas,  and Frenchiecabaret girls who perform at the Kit Kat Klub
Bobby, Victor, Hans, and Hermancabaret boys who perform at the Kit Kat Klub
Maxthe proprietor of the Kit Kat Klub and Sally's former boyfriend

Musical numbers 
Every production of Cabaret has modified the original score, with songs being changed, cut, or added from the film version. This is a collective list featuring all songs from every major production.

Act I
 "Willkommen"Emcee and Company
 "So What?"Fräulein Schneider
 "Telephone Song/Telephone Dance"Cliff and Company
 "Don't Tell Mama"Sally and the Kit Kat Girls
 "Mein Herr"Sally
 "Perfectly Marvelous"Sally and Cliff
 "Two Ladies"Emcee and Two Ladies
 "It Couldn't Please Me More (A Pineapple)"Fräulein Schneider and Herr Schultz
 "Tomorrow Belongs to Me"Nazi Youth/Waiters/Emcee
 "Why Should I Wake Up?"Cliff
 "Don't Go"Cliff
 "Maybe This Time"Sally
 "Sitting Pretty"Emcee and Girls
 "Money"Emcee and Company
 "Married"Herr Schultz and Fräulein Schneider
 "Meeskite"Herr Schultz and Sally
 "Tomorrow Belongs to Me" (Reprise)Fräulein Kost, Ernst Ludwig and Company

Act II
 "" / "Kickline"Emcee and Girls
 "Married" (Reprise)Herr Schultz
 "If You Could See Her (The Gorilla Song)"Emcee
 "What Would You Do?"Fräulein Schneider
 "I Don't Care Much" – Emcee
 "Cabaret"Sally
 "Willkommen (Reprise)" / "Finale Ultimo"Emcee, Cliff, and Company

Song modifications 
Many songs planned for the 1966 production were cut. Three excised songs—"Good Time Charlie", "It'll All Blow Over", and "Roommates"—were recorded by Kander and Ebb, and the sheet music published in a collector's book. "Good Time Charlie" was to be sung by Sally to Cliff while walking to Fräulein Schneider and Herr Schultz's engagement party, with Sally mocking Cliff for his gloominess. "It'll All Blow Over" was planned for the end of the first act: Fräulein Schneider is concerned that marrying a Jew might be unwise, while Cliff is concerned about Germany's incipient Nazism. In the song, Sally declares that all will turn out well in the end. "Roommates" was replaced by "Perfectly Marvelous" and serves the same plot function of Sally convincing Cliff to let her move in with him.

The 1972 film added several songs, notably "" and "Maybe This Time" which were included in later productions. The latter song had been written by Kander and Ebb for the unproduced musical Golden Gate. The later 1987 and 1998 Broadway revivals also added new songs such as "I Don't Care Much". In the 1987 revival, a new song was written for Cliff entitled "Don't Go". In the 1998 revival, "Mein Herr" replaced "The Telephone Song", and "Maybe This Time" replaced "Why Should I Wake Up?".

Originally, the song "Sitting Pretty" was sung by the Emcee accompanied by the cabaret girls in international costumes and their units of currency representing Russian rubles, Japanese yen, French francs, American dollars, and German reichsmarks. For the 1972 film, this number was then replaced by "Money, Money", and sung by the Emcee and Sally Bowles. However, "Sitting Pretty" is still heard briefly in the film as orchestral background music. For the 1987 revival, there was a special version comprising a medley of both money songs, and motifs from the later song were incorporated into the "international" dance that had "Sitting Pretty". For the 1998 revival, only the later song written for the film was used. This version added the cabaret girls and had a darker undertone.

Productions

Original Broadway production 

The musical opened on Broadway on November 20, 1966, at the Broadhurst Theatre, transferred to the Imperial Theatre and then the Broadway Theatre before closing on September 6, 1969, after 1,166 performances and 21 previews. Directed by Harold Prince and choreographed by Ron Field, the cast featured Jill Haworth as Sally, Bert Convy as Cliff, Lotte Lenya as Fräulein Schneider, Jack Gilford as Herr Schultz, Joel Grey as the Emcee, Edward Winter as Ernst, and Peg Murray as Fräulein Kost. Replacements later in the run included Anita Gillette and Melissa Hart as Sally, Ken Kercheval and Larry Kert as Cliff, and Martin Ross as the Emcee. In addition, John Serry Sr. performed as the orchestral accordionist.

The original Broadway production was not an instant success according to playwright Joe Masteroff due to its perceived immoral content. "When the show opened in Boston," Masteroff recalled, "there were a lot of walkouts. Once the reviews came out, the public came back." At the time, actor Joel Grey was merely fifth-billed in the show. Nevertheless, audiences were hypnotized by Grey's sinister performance as the Emcee.

In contrast, Jill Haworth's performance as Sally was less well-received and was criticized for its blandness. Emory Lewis, the reviewer for The Morning Call, wrote that "Jill Haworth, the lovely English actress who played Sally Bowles on opening night, was personable, but she was not sufficiently trained for so pivotal a role. And her voice was small and undramatic. Her performance threw 'Cabaret' out of kilter."

The 1967–68 US national tour featured Melissa Hart as Sally, Signe Hasso as Fräulein Schneider, and Leo Fuchs as Herr Schultz. The tour included the Shubert Theatre in New Haven, Connecticut in December 1967, the Ahmanson Theatre in Los Angeles in May 1968, the Curran Theatre in San Francisco in September 1968, and many others.

Original West End production 
The musical premiered in the West End on February 28, 1968, at the Palace Theatre with Judi Dench as Sally, Kevin Colson as Cliff, Barry Dennen as the Emcee, Lila Kedrova as Fräulein Schneider and Peter Sallis as Herr Schultz. It ran for 336 performances. Critics such as Ken Mandelbaum have asserted that "Judi Dench was the finest of all the Sallys that appeared in Hal Prince's original staging, and if she's obviously not much of a singer, her Sally is a perfect example of how one can give a thrilling musical theatre performance without a great singing voice."

1986 West End revival 

In 1986, the show was revived in London at the Strand Theatre starring Kelly Hunter as Sally, Peter Land as Cliff and Wayne Sleep as the Emcee, directed and choreographed by Gillian Lynne.

1987 Broadway revival 
The first Broadway revival opened on October 22, 1987, with direction and choreography by Prince and Field. The revival opened at the Imperial Theatre, and then transferred to the Minskoff Theatre to complete its 261-performance run. Joel Grey received star billing as the Emcee, with Alyson Reed as Sally, Gregg Edelman as Cliff, Regina Resnik as Fräulein Schneider, Werner Klemperer as Herr Schultz, and David Staller as Ernst Ludwig. The song "Don't Go" was added for Cliff's character.

1993 London revival 

In 1993, Sam Mendes directed a new production for the Donmar Warehouse in London's West End. The revival starred Jane Horrocks as Sally, Adam Godley as Cliff, Alan Cumming as the Emcee and Sara Kestelman as Fräulein Schneider. Cumming received an Olivier Award nomination for his performance and Kestelman won the Olivier for Best Supporting Performance in a Musical.

Mendes' conception was very different from either the original production or the conventional first revival. The most significant change was the character of the Emcee. The role, as played by Joel Grey in both prior incarnations, was an asexual, edgy character with rouged cheeks dressed in a tuxedo. Alan Cumming's portrayal was highly sexualized, as he wore suspenders around his crotch and red paint on his nipples.

Staging details differed as well. Instead of "Tomorrow Belongs to Me" being performed by a male choir of waiting staff, the Emcee plays a recording of a boy soprano singing it. In the final scene, the Emcee removes his outer clothes to reveal a striped uniform of the type worn by the internees in concentration camps; on it are pinned a yellow badge (identifying Jews), a red star (marking Communists and socialists), and a pink triangle (denoting homosexuals). Other changes included added references to Cliff's bisexuality, including a brief scene where he kisses one of the Cabaret boys. "I Don't Care Much," which was added for the 1987 Broadway revival, was maintained for this production, and "Mein Herr" was added from the film.

This production was filmed by Channel Four Film for airing on UK television.

1998 Broadway revival 

The second Broadway revival was based on the 1993 Mendes-Donmar Warehouse production. For the Broadway transfer, Rob Marshall was co-director and choreographer. The production opened after 37 previews on March 19, 1998, at the Kit Kat Klub, housed in what previously had been known as Henry Miller's Theatre. Later that year it transferred to Studio 54, where it remained for the rest of its 2,377-performance run, becoming the third longest-running revival in Broadway musical history, third only to Oh! Calcutta! and Chicago. For the Broadway production, Cumming reprised his role as the Emcee, opposite newcomers Natasha Richardson as Sally, John Benjamin Hickey as Cliff, Ron Rifkin as Herr Schultz, Denis O'Hare as Ernst Ludwig, Michele Pawk as Fräulein Kost, and Mary Louise Wilson as Fräulein Schneider.

The Broadway production was nominated for ten Tony Awards, winning four for Cumming, Richardson and Rifkin, as well as the Tony for Best Revival of a Musical. This production featured a number of notable replacements later in the run: Jennifer Jason Leigh, Susan Egan, Joely Fisher, Gina Gershon, Debbie Gibson, Teri Hatcher, Melina Kanakaredes, Jane Leeves, Molly Ringwald, Brooke Shields, and Lea Thompson as Sally; Michael C. Hall, Raúl Esparza, Neil Patrick Harris, Adam Pascal, Jon Secada, Norbert Leo Butz and John Stamos as the Emcee; Boyd Gaines and Michael Hayden as Cliff; Tom Bosley, Dick Latessa, Hal Linden, Laurence Luckinbill, and Tony Roberts as Herr Schultz; and Blair Brown, Polly Bergen, Mariette Hartley and Carole Shelley as Fräulein Schneider.

There were a number of changes made between the 1993 and 1998 revivals, despite the similarities in creative team. The cabaret number "Two Ladies" was staged with the Emcee, a cabaret girl, and a cabaret boy in drag and included a shadow play simulating various sexual positions. The score was re-orchestrated using synthesizer effects and expanding the stage band, with all the instruments now being played by the cabaret girls and boys. The satiric "Sitting Pretty", with its mocking references to deprivation, despair and hunger, was eliminated, as it had been in the film version, and where in the 1993 revival it had been combined with "Money" (as it had been in 1987 London production), "Money" was now performed on its own. "Maybe This Time", from the film adaptation, was added to the score.

2006 West End revival 
In September 2006, a new production of the show opened at the Lyric Theatre, directed by Rufus Norris, and starring Anna Maxwell Martin as Sally, James Dreyfus as the Emcee, Harriet Thorpe as Fräulein Kost, and Sheila Hancock as Fräulein Schneider. Hancock won the Olivier Award for Best Supporting Performance in a Musical. Replacements later in the run included Kim Medcalf and Amy Nuttall as Sally, Honor Blackman and Angela Richards as Fräulein Schneider, and Julian Clary and Alistair McGowan as the Emcee. This production closed in June 2008 and toured nationally for two years with a cast that included Wayne Sleep as the Emcee and Samantha Barks as Sally, before Siobhan Dillon took over the role.

2012 West End revival 
A revival opened in the West End at the Savoy Theatre on October 3, 2012, following a four-week tour of the UK, including Bromley, Southampton, Nottingham, Norwich and Salford. Will Young played the Emcee and Michelle Ryan portrayed Sally Bowles. It was announced on August 10, 2012, that Siân Phillips, Harriet Thorpe and Matt Rawle would also be joining the cast. The production was made by the creative team behind the 2006 London revival, but they created a different set, lighting, costumes, choreography and direction. In August 2013 the show went on tour, again with Young as The Emcee, Siobhan Dillon reprising her role of Sally and Lyn Paul joining the cast as Fräulein Schneider.

The production toured the UK in autumn 2017 with Young reprising his role as the Emcee and Louise Redknapp as Sally Bowles. Another UK tour began in autumn 2019 starring John Partridge as the Emcee, Kara Lily Hayworth as Sally Bowles and Anita Harris as Fräulein Schneider.

2014 Broadway revival 

In September 2013 Roundabout Theatre Company announced plans to return the company's acclaimed 1998 production to Studio 54 in New York. For this, the show's third Broadway revival, Sam Mendes and Rob Marshall reprised their respective roles as director and co-director/choreographer to recreate their work from the earlier production. Alan Cumming starred again as the Emcee while Academy Award-nominee Michelle Williams made her Broadway debut as Sally Bowles. On October 7, 2013, Tony Award nominees Danny Burstein and Linda Emond joined the cast as Herr Schultz and Fräulein Schneider. The production began a 24-week limited engagement with previews from March 21, 2014, with opening night on April 24, 2014. This engagement was later extended to a 36-week run concluding on January 4, 2015.

Emma Stone replaced Michelle Williams as Sally from November 11, 2014, until February 15, 2015. Critics praised Stone's performance for her interpretation of the hard-drinking sybarite Sally Bowles "as a flaming flapper, the kind hymned by F. Scott Fitzgerald and embodied by the young Joan Crawford in silent movies." Alan Cumming continued in the role of the Emcee until the show's final curtain in March 2015. On February 17, Sienna Miller replaced Stone as Sally through to the show's closing on March 29, 2015.

The production later toured the US from January 2016 with Randy Harrison as the Emcee and Andrea Goss (following her appearance as Frenchie in the Broadway production). They were later replaced by Jon Peterson and Leigh Ann Larkin.

2021 West End revival 
In May 2021, it was announced that Eddie Redmayne and Jessie Buckley would star as the Emcee and Sally Bowles in a new production directed by Rebecca Frecknall, designed by Tom Scutt, choreographed by Julia Cheng with musical supervision and direction by Jennifer Whyte, lighting design by Isabella Byrd, sound design by Nick Lidster, casting by Stuart Burt and fight direction by Jonathan Holby. The production also features Omari Douglas as Cliff Bradshaw, Liza Sadovy as Fraulein Schneider, Elliot Levey as Herr Schultz, Stewart Clarke as Ernst Ludwig and Anna-Jane Casey as Fraulein Kost.

Produced by Underbelly and Ambassador Theatre Group, the production entitled Cabaret at the Kit Kat Club began previews at the Playhouse Theatre on November 15, 2021, which has been refurbished as the "Kit Kat Club" which includes an intimate in-the-round stage reduced to a 550-seat capacity with tables that audience members can dine at as well as a refurbished foyer. On December 14, 2021, it was announced that the production's run would be extended to October 2022. The production led the 2022 Olivier Award nominations with 11 nods, including Best Musical Revival, Best Actor in a Musical for Redmayne and Best Actress in a Musical for Buckley. The production won 7 awards and set a record for being the most award-winning revival in Olivier history, as well for being the first production to obtain awards in all 4 eligible acting categories.

Fra Fee and Amy Lennox took over as The Emcee and Sally Bowles with Omar Baroud as Cliff Bradshaw and Vivien Parry as Fraulein Schneider from March 21, 2022. From 3 October 2022, Callum Scott Howells and Madeline Brewer took over as the Emcee and Sally Bowles. On 10 January 2023, it was announced that Aimee Lou Wood and John McCrea would take over as Sally Bowles and the Emcee from 13 February 2023.

Other productions 

In 1993 a production of Cabaret debuted at the Octagon Theatre in Bolton, England. This version was directed by Ian Forest, designed by Ashley Sharp, and starred Ashley Artus as the Emcee. Critic Natalia Anglesey of The Stage opined that "undoubtedly the star of this particular production of Cabaret is the physically flexible Ashley Artus as the sinister Emcee who adroitly controls the cast and members of his club whilst leading us into the nightmarish world of pre-war Berlin." Artus would later garner the Manchester Evening News Drama Award Nomination for his performance.

A BBC Radio 2 radio broadcast in 1996 at the Golders Green Hippodrome starred Claire Burt as Sally Bowles, Steven Berkoff as the Emcee, Alex Hanson as Clifford Bradshaw, Keith Michell as Herr Schultz, and Rosemary Leach as Fräulein Schneider.

Since 2003, there have been successful international stagings of the show—many of which have been influenced by Mendes' concept—including productions in Argentina, Australia, Brazil, Canada, Colombia, Costa Rica, France, Portugal, Greece, Israel, Malaysia, Mexico, Peru, Puerto Rico, Serbia, South Africa, Spain, and Venezuela. In 2008, the Stratford Shakespeare Festival performed a well-received production at the Avon Theatre designed by Douglas Paraschuk and directed by Amanda Dehnert, featuring Bruce Dow as the Emcee, Trish Lindström as Sally, Sean Arbuckle as Cliff, Nora McClellan as Fräulein Schneider and Frank Moore as Herr Schultz.

The Shaw Festival at Niagara-on-the-Lake, Ontario, included Cabaret in its 2014 season. The production, which ran from April 10 – October 26, 2014 at the Festival Theatre, was directed by Peter Hinton with choreography by Denise Clarke. The production featured Juan Chioran as the Emcee, Deborah Hay as Sally, Gray Powell as Cliff, Benedict Campbell as Herr Schultz, and Corrine Koslo as Fräulein Schneider. Hinton's version was influenced by Mendes' 1993 revival.

In 2016, Project Broadway and Broadway Workshop presented Cabaret as their main stage production. The cast, made of over 50 teenage actors divided into two casts, played to the sold-out Baruch Performing Arts Center in New York City. The production was the first in New York City since the Roundabout Theatre Company revival in 2014. The production was directed by Broadway Workshop founder Marc Tumminelli. Among the cast were Michael Nigro and Micaela Diamond.

A 2017 revival production with new direction played Sydney and Melbourne, Australia. The production starred Paul Capsis as the Emcee and Chelsea Gibb as Sally. The production mixed elements of the Mendes production, such as its version of "Two Ladies" and its portrayal of a gay Cliff, with the colorful art design of the original (the Emcee is in full makeup and clothed) and most of the additional songs from the 1972 film (with the exception of "Mein Herr").

Casts

Notable replacements 

Broadway (1966–1969)
Herr Ludwig: George Reinholt
Fräulein Kost: Rhoda Gemignani
Broadway revival (1987–1988)
Fräulein Schneider: Peg Murray
Broadway revival (1998–2004)
The Emcee: Michael C. Hall, Matt McGrath, Raúl Esparza, John Stamos, Neil Patrick Harris, Norbert Leo Butz, Jon Secada, Adam Pascal
Sally Bowles: Jennifer Jason Leigh, Mary McCormack, Susan Egan, Joely Fisher, Lea Thompson, Gina Gershon, Brooke Shields, Molly Ringwald, Jane Leeves, Debbie Gibson, Melina Kanakaredes, Teri Hatcher, Vanna White
Cliff Bradshaw: Boyd Gaines, Michael Hayden, Rick Holmes
Fräulein Schneider: Blair Brown, Carole Shelley, Polly Bergen, Alma Cuervo, Mariette Hartley
Herr Schultz: Laurence Luckinbill, Dick Latessa, Larry Keith, Hal Linden, Tom Bosley, Tony Roberts 
Herr Ludwig: Michael Stuhlbarg, Martin Moran
Fräulein Kost: Victoria Clark
West End revival (2006–2008)
The Emcee: Julian Clary, Alistair McGowan
Sally Bowles: Kim Medcalf, Amy Nuttall
Fräulein Schneider: Honor Blackman, Angela Richards
Herr Schultz: Francis Matthews, Barry James
Broadway revival (2014–2015)
Sally Bowles: Emma Stone, Sienna Miller
Fräulein Kost: Hani Furstenberg
West End revival (2021– )
The Emcee: Fra Fee, Callum Scott Howells, John McCrea
Sally Bowles: Amy Lennox, Madeline Brewer, Aimee Lou Wood

Additional performers 
The Emcee: Max von Essen, Joey McIntyre, Brad Oscar, John Partridge, Wesley Taylor
Sally Bowles: Samantha Barks

Recordings 

The first recording of Cabaret was the original cast album with a number of the songs either truncated (e.g., "Sitting Pretty"/"The Money Song") or outright cut to conserve disk space. When this album was released on compact disc, Kander and Ebb's voice-and-piano recordings of songs cut from the musical were added as bonus material.

The 1968 London cast recording purportedly features "a more accurate rendering of the score" and includes "the Act One finale 'Tomorrow Belongs To Me' reprise, the second-act finale as performed in the theatre, and a number of other previously unrecorded bits and pieces." It was released in the UK and reissued on the CBS Embassy label in 1973.

The 1972 movie soundtrack with Liza Minnelli is perhaps the best-known of the recordings, although the movie is much re-written and eliminates all but six of the original songs from the stage production.

Both the 1986 London and 1998 Broadway revival casts were recorded. A 1993 two-CD studio recording contains more or less the entire score, including songs written for the movie or for later productions, and many incidentals and instrumentals not usually recorded. This recording features Jonathan Pryce as the Emcee, Maria Friedman as Sally, Gregg Edelman as Cliff, Judi Dench as Fräulein Schneider, and Fred Ebb as Herr Schultz.

The cast recording of the 2006 London revival at the Lyric Theatre includes James Dreyfus as the Emcee and Anna Maxwell Martin as Sally Bowles. The recording peaked number 107 on the French Albums Chart, and number 49 on the Dutch Albums Chart.

The 2021 London cast recording featuring Eddie Redmayne and Jessie Buckley was recorded live at the Kit Kat Club (Playhouse Theatre, London) and released on 20 January 2023.

In addition to these recordings, cast albums for the French, Spanish, Greek, Hebrew, Italian, Austrian, Dutch, Mexican, and two German productions have been released.

Awards and nominations

Original Broadway production

1987 Broadway revival

1993 London revival

1998 Broadway revival

2006 West End revival

2012 West End revival

2014 Broadway revival

2021 West End revival

References

Notes

Citations

Works cited

Print sources

Online sources

External links 

 The Making of Cabaret by Keith Garebian. OUP 2011 2nd edition. pdf at swab.zlibcdn.com.
 
 
 Plot and production information at the Guide to Musical Theatre

Fiction set in 1929
1966 musicals
Works set in Berlin
Broadway musicals
Drama Desk Award-winning musicals
Helpmann Award-winning musicals
LGBT-related musicals
Musicals about World War II
Musicals based on plays
Musicals by Kander and Ebb
Musical television films
Plays set in Germany
Tony Award for Best Musical
West End musicals
Works set in cabarets
Plays about abortion
Tony Award-winning musicals